The J Golf Phoenix LPGA International, in full the J Golf Phoenix LPGA International Presented by Mirassou Winery, was a women's professional golf tournament in Arizona on the LPGA Tour. Founded as the "Sun City Classic" in 1980, it was held annually in the Phoenix area through 2009, making it one of the longest-lasting events on the LPGA Tour. 

Tournament Golf Foundation managed the tournament since its start and continues to manage the Safeway Classic tournament on the LPGA Tour. Proceeds from the event were donated to local medical charities; over $12 million was raised during the course of the tournament

The tournament had a variety of sponsors during its history, including Safeway Inc., a California-based supermarket chain. 

It was at this tournament that Annika Sörenstam shot 59 in the second round in 2001, which stands as the record for the lowest scoring round ever shot for 18 holes in an LPGA Tour event. With thirteen birdies and no bogeys, she began the round with eight birdies, added four more over the next five holes, but managed only one over the final five. Sörenstam won the event with 261 (–27), two strokes ahead of runner-up Se Ri Pak.

The LPGA Tour returned to the Phoenix area in 2011 with the Founders Cup.

Tournament names
1980–1981: Sun City Classic
1982: American Express Sun City Classic
1983–1985: Samaritan Turquoise Classic
1986: Standard Register/Samaritan Turquoise Classic
1987–1990: Standard Register Turquoise Classic
1991–2001: Standard Register PING
2002: PING Banner Health
2003 Safeway PING Presented by Yoplait
2004–2008: Safeway International
2009: J Golf Phoenix LPGA International Presented by Mirassou Winery

Winners

^ The 1983 edition was shortened to 54 holes due to rain and concluded on Monday.

Multiple winners
Six players won the event more than once:
4 wins: Laura Davies (1994, 1995, 1996, 1997) 
3 wins: Annika Sörenstam (2001, 2004, 2005)
2 wins: Pat Bradley (1987, 1990), Danielle Ammaccapane (1991, 1992), Lorena Ochoa (2007, 2008), Karrie Webb (1999, 2009)

Course records

References

External links
LPGA official microsite

Former LPGA Tour events
Golf in Arizona
Sports in Phoenix, Arizona
Recurring sporting events established in 1980
Recurring sporting events disestablished in 2009
Women's sports in Arizona